Erison Carlos dos Santos Silva (born May 22, 1980) is a former Brazilian football player.

Club statistics

References
https://web.archive.org/web/20110813091225/http://cerezo.co.jp/news_detail_backnum.asp?c_idx=2655&contents_code=100&date_s=2006%2F01&iPage=

External links

1985 births
Living people
Brazilian footballers
Brazilian expatriate footballers
Sport Club Corinthians Paulista players
Associação Desportiva São Caetano players
Cerezo Osaka players
Associação Atlética Ponte Preta players
Busan IPark players
Avaí FC players
Campeonato Brasileiro Série A players
Campeonato Brasileiro Série B players
J1 League players
K League 1 players
Brazilian expatriate sportspeople in Japan
Brazilian expatriate sportspeople in South Korea
Expatriate footballers in Japan
Expatriate footballers in South Korea
Association football midfielders
People from Barra do Piraí